David Schwartz (born August 6, 1967 in Brooklyn, New York City) is an American criminal defense attorney and former prosecutor from New York. Schwartz is partner at Gerstman Schwartz & Malito, a boutique law firm in New York City. Schwartz is the current attorney and media spokesperson representing Michael Cohen in the Stormy Daniels–Donald Trump scandal.

Career

Schwartz currently practices law,  lobbying (government relations) with his appearances in the United States Supreme Court, United States District Court of New York,  United States Tax Court, New York State Supreme Court, New York City Criminal and Civil Court, and Nassau County District Court. He is also a member of the Forbes New York Business Council and appears in the media to comment on  legal issues and represents parties in notable lawsuits.

During his career, Schwartz represented several defendants in high-profile cases including the rape trial of Nicki Minaj's brother  and the Yellow Cab, New York taxi medallions owners and Uber.

The New York State Senate appointed Schwartz as a member of its commission on judicial nomination of Justices to the New York Court of Appeals. He also served as a trustee of the Brooklyn Bar Association. Schwartz practiced law as a litigator, a lobbyist and advocate of businesses, trade associations, not-for-profits and individuals during the past decades. He served the People of the State of New York as an Assistant District Attorney in Kings County from 1993 to 1997. In this position, Schwartz handled hundreds of criminal prosecutions.

Stormy Daniels−Donald Trump scandal 

During the Stormy Daniels-Trump story, Schwartz acted as Cohen's attorney and representative in the media. For example, Schwartz  had  on March 19, 2018, a heated discussion on CNN with Stormy Daniel's attorney Michael Avenatti about a  contested non disclosure agreement.

References

External links
     Official Gerstman Schwartz & Malito page

1967 births
21st-century American lawyers
Tulane University alumni
Jewish American attorneys
Living people
New York (state) lawyers
Donald Trump litigation